The 60th Virginia Infantry Regiment was an infantry regiment raised in Virginia for service in the Confederate States Army during the American Civil War. It fought mostly with the Army of Northern Virginia and in Tennessee.

The 60th Virginia (also called 3rd Regiment, Wise Legion) was organized in August 1861. The unit served in Field's, McCausland's, and T. Smith's Brigade. It fought in the Seven Days' Battles and reported 31 killed and 173 wounded. Later it was attached to the Department of Western Virginia and East Tennessee and participated in numerous conflicts including the fight at Piedmont. The 60th took part in Early's operations in the Shenandoah Valley and fought its last battle at Waynesboro. During mid-April, 1865, it disbanded.

The field officers were Colonels Beuhring H. Jones and William H. Starke; Lieutenant Colonels James L. Corley, William A. Gilliam, George W. Hammond, J.W. Spaulding, John C. Summers, and W.A. Swank; and Majors William S. Rowan, James W. Sweeney, and Jacob N. Taylor. The last officer to command the unit on the field of battle was Acting Major John L. Caynor who was captured with much of the unit at the Battle of Waynesboro on March 2, 1865.

See also

List of Virginia Civil War units
List of West Virginia Civil War Confederate units

References

Units and formations of the Confederate States Army from Virginia
1861 establishments in Virginia
Military units and formations established in 1861
1865 disestablishments in Virginia
Military units and formations disestablished in 1865